David Matthews (Urdu: ڈیوڈ میتھیوز) was a British scholar, author, and translator of Urdu literature and translator of Muhammad Iqbal and Mir Anees poetry in English. He taught Urdu language and Urdu literature for over 30 years (1965–99) at the School of Oriental and African Studies, University of London after graduating in Classics at UCL.

Books
Matthews published a number of works relating to Urdu literature, including many translations of significant classical Urdu works. One of his major interests was poetry. His 70 works have appeared in 250 publications in 4 languages and 2091 library holdings.
The Courtesan of Lucknow
Umrao Jan Ada
Urdu Literature
Complete Urdu Beginner to Intermediate Course
Essential Urdu Dictionary

See also
Ralph Russell
Gopi Chand Narang

References

Academics of SOAS University of London
Urdu-language writers
Linguists from the United Kingdom
Linguists of Urdu
Urdu critics
People from Loughton
20th-century linguists
1942 births
2021 deaths